Andrea Ojeda (born 17 January 1985) is an Argentine footballer who plays as a forward for Boca Juniors. She was a member of the Argentina women's national team.

Club career
Ojeda played in Argentina for Boca Juniors as well in Spain for Fundación Albacete and Granada CF.

International career
Ojeda played for the Argentina women's national football team at the 2008 Summer Olympics.

See also
 Argentina at the 2008 Summer Olympics

References

External links
 
 
 Andrea Ojeda at FutbolEsta.com 

1985 births
Living people
Women's association football forwards
Argentine women's footballers
Place of birth missing (living people)
Argentina women's international footballers
2007 FIFA Women's World Cup players
Olympic footballers of Argentina
Footballers at the 2008 Summer Olympics
Fundación Albacete players
Primera División (women) players
Argentine expatriate women's footballers
Argentine expatriate sportspeople in Spain
Expatriate women's footballers in Spain
Granada CF (women) players